David Changleng (born 25 April 1970) is a Scottish rugby union referee. He is the identical twin brother of fellow referee Malcolm Changleng.

Rugby Union career

Playing career

Amateur career

Changleng began his rugby career as a player with Gala RFC, playing at fly-half in a team that included Gregor Townsend and Chris Paterson.

International career

Early in his playing career, he also won one cap for the Scotland Under-21s.

Referee career

After retiring as a player, Changleng took up refereeing in 1997. He became a regular referee in the Scottish Premiership and on the Borders Sevens Circuit.

He refereed his first European game on 12 January 2002, when he officiated Montauban's 40–9 win over Rovigo in the pool stage of the 2001–02 European Challenge Cup.

He took charge of his first Heineken Cup match three years later for the Leicester Tigers' 37–6 win over Calvisano in the pool stage of the 2004–05 tournament.

Changleng has also been a regular referee in the Celtic League since its establishment in 2001–02.

Teaching career

After retiring as a player, Changleng became a PE teacher at Peebles High School.

References

1970 births
Living people
Rugby union players from Scottish Borders
Scottish rugby union players
Scottish people of Filipino descent
Rugby union fly-halves
Gala RFC players
Scottish rugby union referees
Identical twins
Scottish twins
Twin sportspeople